In Greek mythology, Bolina (Ancient Greek: Βολίνα) or Boline (Βολίνη) was a nymph. According to Pausanias, Bolina was once a mortal maiden of Achaea. She was loved by the god Apollo, and when he attempted to approach her, Bolina fled from him and threw herself into the sea to escape his advances. Thereupon the god made her immortal. On the spot where Bolina fell into the sea, the town Bolina was founded.

Bibliography

Alexios Panagopoulou, Istoriko lexiko periochis dimou Riou nomou Achaias (Ιστορικό λεξικό περιοχής δήμου Ρίου νομού Αχαίας = Historic Dictionary of the Municipality of Rio, Achaia, Peri Technon, Patras 2003, 
Athanasios Angelopoulou New Greek Mythology Dictionary, Eletheris

References

Mythology of Achaea
Nymphs
Deeds of Apollo